Siku (also spelled Siqu) (Aymara siku or siqu a kind of flute, also spelled Sekho, Seko) or Siq'u (Quechua for slidable rope; perforated) are the names of a mountain in the Bolivian Andes which reaches a height of approximately . It is located in the Potosí Department, Antonio Quijarro Province, Tomave Municipality.

References 

Mountains of Potosí Department